The Ichneumonidae, also known as the ichneumon wasps, Darwin wasps, or ichneumonids, are a family of parasitoid wasps of the insect order Hymenoptera. They are one of the most diverse groups within the Hymenoptera with roughly 25,000 species currently described. However, this likely represents less than a quarter of their true richness as reliable estimates are lacking, along with much of the most basic knowledge about their ecology, distribution, and evolution. It is estimated that there are more species in this family than there are species of birds and mammals combined. Ichneumonid wasps, with very few exceptions, attack the immature stages of holometabolous insects and spiders, eventually killing their hosts. They thus fulfill an important role as regulators of insect populations, both in natural and semi-natural systems, making them promising agents for biological control.

The distribution of the ichneumonids was traditionally considered an exception to the common latitudinal gradient in species diversity, since the family was thought to be at its most species-rich in the temperate zone instead of the tropics, but numerous new tropical species have now been discovered.

Etymology and history
Insects in the family Ichneumonidae are commonly called ichneumon wasps, or ichneumonids. However, the term ichneumon wasps can refer specifically to the genus Ichneumon within the Ichneumonidae and thus can cause confusion. A group of ichneumonid specialists have proposed Darwin wasps as a better vernacular name for the family. Less exact terms are ichneumon flies (they are not closely related to true flies) and scorpion wasps due to the extreme lengthening and curving of the abdomen (scorpions are arachnids, not insects).

The name is derived from Latin 'ichneumon', from Ancient Greek ἰχνεύμων (ikhneúmōn, "tracker"), from ἴχνος (íkhnos, "track, footstep"). The name first appeared in Aristotle's "History of Animals", c. 343 BC. Aristotle noted that the ichneumon preys upon spiders, is a wasp smaller than ordinary wasps, and carries its prey to a hole which they lay their larvae inside, and that they seal the hole with mud. Aristotle's writing, however, more accurately describes the mud daubers than the true ichneumon wasps, which do not construct mud nests and do not sting.

Description
Adult ichneumonids superficially resemble other wasps. They have a slender waist, two pairs of wings, a pair of large compound eyes on the side of the head and three ocelli on top of the head. Their size varies considerably from a few millimetres to seven or more centimetres.

The ichneumonids have more antennal segments than typical, aculeate wasps (Aculeata: Vespoidea and Apoidea): ichneumonids typically possess 16 or more, while most other wasps have 13 or fewer. Unlike aculeate wasps, which have an ovipositor modified for prey capture and defense, and do not pass their eggs along the stinger, ichneumonid females have an unmodified ovipositor which they use to lay eggs inside or on their host. Ichneumonids generally inject venom along with the egg, but only larger species (some in the genera Netelia and Ophion) with relatively short ovipositors use the ovipositor in defense. Males do not possess stingers or ovipositors in either lineage.

Ichneumonids are distinguished from their sister group Braconidae mainly on the basis of wing venation. The fore wing of 95% of ichneumonids has vein 2m-cu (in the Comstock–Needham system), which is absent in braconids. Vein 1rs-m of the fore wing is absent in all ichneumonids, but is present in 85% of braconids. In the hind wing of ichneumonids, vein rs-m joins Rs apical to (or rarely opposite) the split between veins Rs and R1. In braconids, vein rs-m joins basal to this split. The taxa also differ in the structure of the metasoma: about 90% of ichneumonids have a flexible suture between tergites 2 and 3, whereas these tergites are fused in braconids (though the suture is secondarily flexible in Aphidiinae).

Distribution
Ichneumonids are found on all continents with the exception of Antarctica. They inhabit virtually all terrestrial habitats, wherever there are suitable invertebrate hosts.

The distribution of ichneumonid species richness is subject to ongoing debate. Long believed to be rare in the tropics, and at its most species rich in the temperate region, the family became a classic textbook example of an 'exceptional' latitudinal diversity gradient. Recently this belief has been questioned, after the discovery of numerous new tropical species.

Reproduction and diet
A very few ichneumonid species lay their eggs in the ground, but the vast majority inject eggs either directly into their host's body or onto its surface, and this may require penetration of substrate around the host, as in wood-boring host larvae that live deep inside of tree trunks, requiring the ichneumon to drill its ovipositor through several centimeters of solid wood (e.g., Megarhyssa species). After hatching, the ichneumonid larva consumes its still living host. The most common hosts are larvae or pupae of Lepidoptera, Coleoptera and Hymenoptera.  Some species in the subfamily Pimplinae also parasitise spiders. Hyperparasitoids such as Mesochorinae oviposit inside the larvae of other ichneumonoids. The hosts of some species are agricultural pests, therefore ichneumons are sometimes valuable for biological pest control, but the hosts of most species are unknown; host information has been reviewed and summarized by various researchers, e.g. Aubert, Perkins. and Townes.

Ichneumonids use both idiobiont and koinobiont strategies. Idiobionts paralyze their host and prevent it from moving or growing. Koinobionts allow their host to continue to grow and develop. In both strategies, the host typically dies after some weeks, after which the ichneumonid larva emerges and pupates. 

Adult ichneumonids feed on a diversity of foods, including plant sap and nectar. They spend much of their active time searching, either for hosts (female ichneumonids) or for emerging females (male ichneumonids).
The parasitism pressure exerted by ichneumonids can be tremendous, and they are often one of the major regulators of invertebrate populations. It is quite common for 10-20% or more of a host's population to be parasitised (though reported parasitism rates often include non-ichneumonid parasitoids).

Taxonomy and systematics

The taxonomy of the ichneumonids is still poorly known. The family is highly diverse, containing 24,000 described species. Approximately 60,000 species are estimated to exist worldwide, though some estimates place this number at over 100,000. They are severely undersampled, and studies of their diversity typically produce very high numbers of species which are represented by only a single individual. Due to the high diversity, the existence of numerous small and hard to identify species, and the majority of species being undiscovered, it has proven difficult to resolve the phylogeny of the ichneumonids. Even the relationships between subfamilies are unclear. The sheer diversity also means DNA sequence data is only available for a tiny fraction of the species, and detailed cladistic studies require major computing capacity.

Extensive catalogues of the ichneumonids include those by Aubert, Gauld, Perkins, and Townes. Due to the taxonomic difficulties involved, however, their classifications and terminology are often confusingly contradictory. Several prominent authors have gone as far as to publish major reviews that defy the International Code of Zoological Nomenclature.

The large number of species in Ichneumonidae may be due to the evolution of parasitoidism in Hymenoptera, which occurred approximately 247 million years ago. Ichneumonidae is the basal branch of Apocrita, the lineage in which parasitoidism in Hymenoptera evolved, and some ichneumonids are thought to have been in stasis for millions of years and closely resemble the common ancestor in which parasitoidism evolved. This common ancestor was likely an Ectoparasitoid woodwasp that parasitized wood-boring beetle larvae in trees. The family has existed since at least the Early Cretaceous ( 125 mya), but probably appeared already in the Jurassic (c. 181 mya), soon after the appearance of its major host groups. It diversified during the Oligocene.

Subfamilies
In 1999, the extant ichneumonids were divided into 39 subfamilies, whose names and definitions have varied considerably. In 2019, combined morphological and molecular phylogenetic analysis of the family resulted in the following 41 subfamilies being recognized, in addition to the extinct Labenopimplinae.

 Acaenitinae Townes, 1950
 Adelognathinae Thomson, 1888
 Agriotypinae Haliday,1838
 Anomaloninae Viereck, 1918 (= Anomalinae)
 Ateleutinae Townes, 1970 (previously part of Cryptinae)
 Banchinae Townes, 1951
 Brachycyrtinae Viereck, 1919 (previously part of Phrudinae)
 Campopleginae Förster, 1869 (= Porizontinae)
 Claseinae Porter, 1998
 Collyriinae Cushman, 1924 
 Cremastinae Förster, 1869
 Cryptinae Kirby, 1837 (= Gelinae, Hemitelinae, Phygadeuontinae)
 Ctenopelmatinae Förster, 1869 (= Scolobatinae)
 Cylloceriinae Wahl, 1990  (sometimes included in Microleptinae)
 Diacritinae Townes, 1965  (sometimes included in Pimplinae)
 Diplazontinae Viereck, 1918
 Eucerotinae Seyrig, 1934 (sometimes included in Tryphoninae)
 Hybrizontinae (= Paxylommatinae) (sometimes placed in own family)
 Ichneumoninae Townes, 1951 (includes Alomyini)
 Labeninae Ashmead,1900 (= Labiinae)
 Labenopimplinae (extinct)
 Lycorininae (sometimes included in Banchinae)
 Mesochorinae Forster, 1869
 Metopiinae Forster, 1869
 Microleptinae Townes, 1958 
 Neorhacodinae (sometimes included in Banchinae)
 Nesomesochorinae Ashmead, 1905 
 Ophioninae Shuckard, 1840
 Orthocentrinae Förster, 1869 (sometimes included in Microleptinae)
 Orthopelmatinae Schmiedeknecht, 1910
 Oxytorinae Thomson, 1883
 Pedunculinae Porter, 1998 
 Phygadeuontinae (previously part of Cryptinae)
 Pimplinae Wesmael, 1845 (= Ephialtinae)
 Poemeniinae Smith & Shenefelt, 1955  (sometimes included in Pimplinae)
 Rhyssinae Morley, 1913 (sometimes included in Pimplinae)
 Sisyrostolinae (sometimes included in Phrudinae)
 Stilbopinae Townes & Townes, 1949 (excluding Notostilbops)
 Tatogastrinae Wahl, 1990 (sometimes included in Microleptinae)
 Tersilochinae Schmiedeknecht, 1910 (includes Neorhacodinae and part of Phrudinae)
 Tryphoninae Shuckard, 1840
 Xoridinae Shuckard, 1840

Famous ichneumonologists
Famous ichneumonologists include:

Jacques Aubert
Carl Gustav Alexander Brischke
Peter Cameron
Arnold Förster
Johann Ludwig Christian Gravenhorst
Alexander Henry Haliday
Gerd Heinrich
August Emil Holmgren
Joseph Kriechbaumer
Thomas Ansell Marshall
Henry Keith Townes
Constantin Wesmael

Darwin and the Ichneumonidae

The perceived cruelty of the ichneumonids troubled philosophers, naturalists, and theologians in the 19th century, who found the parasitoid life cycle inconsistent with the notion of a world created by a loving and benevolent God.  Charles Darwin found the example of the Ichneumonidae so troubling that it contributed to his increasing doubts about the nature and existence of a Creator. In an 1860 letter to the American naturalist Asa Gray, Darwin wrote:
    I own that I cannot see as plainly as others do, and as I should wish to do, evidence of design and beneficence on all sides of us. There seems to me too much misery in the world. I cannot persuade myself that a beneficent and omnipotent God would have designedly created the Ichneumonidae with the express intention of their feeding within the living bodies of Caterpillars, or that a cat should play with mice.

Morphology

See also
Checklist of UK recorded Ichneumonidae

References

External links

Long Family Description Many illustrations from John Curtis British Entomology
Fauna Europaea
Ichneumonidae:Classification of afrotropical ichneumonid wasps. Extensive use of images.
 Family Ichneumonidae at EOL Comprehensive taxonomic resource and image database
 Images of Ichneumonidae species in New Zealand
 W.Rutkies Images. Authority id.
 Genera Ichneumonorum Nearctica. Morphology of Ichneumonidae

 
Biological pest control wasps
Articles containing video clips
Apocrita families
Taxa named by Pierre André Latreille